Wilk v. American Medical Association, 895 F.2d 352 (7th Cir. 1990), was a federal antitrust suit brought against the American Medical Association (AMA) and 10 co-defendants by chiropractor Chester A. Wilk, DC, and four co-plaintiffs. It resulted in a ruling against the AMA.

Case history

Pre-trial environment

Until 1983, the AMA held that it was unethical for medical doctors to associate with an "unscientific practitioner," and labeled chiropractic "an unscientific cult."

Before 1980, 
Principle 3 of the AMA Principles of medical ethics stated: "A physician should practice a method of healing founded on a scientific basis; and he should not voluntarily professionally associate with anyone who violates this principle." In 1980 during a major revision of ethical rules (while the Wilk litigation was in progress), it replaced Principle 3, stating that a physician "shall be free to choose whom to serve, with whom to associate, and the environment in which to provide medical services." Also, up until 1974, the AMA had a Committee on quackery which challenged what it considered to be unscientific forms of healing. Wilk argued that this committee was established specifically to undermine chiropractic.

The first trial
In 1976, Chester Wilk and four other chiropractors sued the AMA, several nationwide healthcare associations, and several physicians for violations of sections 1 and 2 of the Sherman Antitrust Act. The plaintiffs lost at the first trial in 1981, then obtained a new trial on appeal in 1983 because of improper jury instructions and admission of irrelevant and prejudicial evidence (Wilk v. American Medical Ass'n, 735 F.2d 217, 7th Cir. 1983).

The second trial
In the second trial case the AMA had the burden of proof, needing to establish the validity of the boycott. The court recognized a "patient care defense," but imposed a difficult burden. The defendants had to show their concern could not have been adequately satisfied in a manner less restrictive of competition. So Wilk and later cases greatly limit the use of "quality of care" defense in boycott cases.

Just before the second trial, the plaintiffs dropped their demand for damages and sought only an injunction. Therefore, the resulting trial in May and June 1987 was a bench trial in which Judge Susan Getzendanner personally heard the evidence and made factual findings.

Judge's findings in the second trial
On September 25, 1987, Getzendanner issued her opinion that the AMA had violated Section 1, but not 2, of the Sherman Act, and that it had engaged in an unlawful conspiracy in restraint of trade "to contain and eliminate the chiropractic profession." (Wilk v. American Medical Ass'n, 671 F. Supp. 1465, N.D. Ill. 1987). She further stated that the "AMA had entered into a long history of illegal behavior". And, she then issued a permanent injunction against the AMA under Section 16 of the Clayton Act to prevent such future behavior. However, she exonerated the two other remaining defendants, the Joint Commission on Accreditation of Hospitals and the American College of Physicians, and dismissed them from the case.

Judge Getzendanner also went out of her way to make clear what she was not doing: 

However Judge Getzendanner went on:

She concluded that the AMA had been too restrictive in its campaign:

Following the second trial 
Both sides cross-appealed, and the district court's decision was affirmed by the U.S. Court of Appeals on February 7, 1990 (Wilk v. American Medical Ass'n,895 F.2d 352, 7th Cir. 1990). The AMA petitioned the U.S. Supreme Court three times, but each time the Court denied certiorari (on June 11, August 13, and November 26, 1990).

The AMA eliminated Principle 3 in 1980 during a major revision of ethical rules (while the Wilk litigation was in progress). Its replacement stated that a physician "shall be free to choose whom to serve, with whom to associate, and the environment in which to provide medical services."  Thus, the AMA now permits medical doctors to refer patients to doctors of chiropractic for such manipulative therapy if the medical doctor believes it is in the best interests of the patients.

References

American Medical Association
Chiropractic
United States antitrust case law
United States Court of Appeals for the Seventh Circuit cases
History of medicine in the United States
1990 in United States case law